Het Loo Palace (meaning "The Lea") is a palace in Apeldoorn, Netherlands, built by the House of Orange-Nassau.

History
The symmetrical Dutch Baroque building was designed by Jacob Roman and Johan van Swieten and was built between 1684 and 1686 for stadtholder-king William III and his consort Princess Mary. The garden was designed by Claude Desgotz.

After the elder House of Orange-Nassau had become extinct with the death of William III of England in 1702, he left all his estates in the Netherlands to his cousin Johan Willem Friso of the House of Nassau-Dietz in his Last Will. However, the King of Prussia claimed them, as he also descended from the Princes of Orange, and the Houses of Orange-Nassau and Hohenzollern had, a few generations before, made an inheritance contract. Therefore, most of the older properties, though not including Het Loo, were in fact taken over by the Hohenzollerns, who never lived there. Johan Willem Friso's son, William IV, Prince of Orange, finally took over Het Loo Palace, Soestdijk Palace, as well as Huis ten Bosch Palace near The Hague. His widow later bought back several of the older properties in and around The Hague from Frederick William I of Prussia in 1732. 

The palace then remained a summer-residence of the House of Orange-Nassau until the death of Queen Wilhelmina in 1962. In 1960 Queen Wilhelmina had declared that when she died the private estate surrounding the palace would go to the State. She did, however, request that it would be returned to her family if the Dutch were to abolish the monarchy. The former crown properties surrounding the palace became property of the Dutch State in 1962 when Wilhelmina died at Het Loo Palace. Her daughter, Queen Juliana, never lived there, but her younger daughter, Princess Margriet, lived in the right wing until 1975. 

The building was renovated between 1976 and 1982. Since 1984, the palace is a state museum open for the general public, showing interiors with original furniture, objects and paintings of the House of Orange-Nassau. It also houses a library devoted to the House of Orange-Nassau and the Museum van de Kanselarij der Nederlandse Orden (Museum of the Netherlands Orders of Knighthood's Chancellery) with books and other material concerning decorations and medals. The building is a rijksmonument and is among the Top 100 Dutch heritage sites.

Architecture

The Dutch Baroque architecture of Het Loo takes pains to minimize the grand stretch of its construction, so emphatic at Versailles, and present itself as just a fine gentleman's residence. Het Loo is not a palace but, as the title of its  engraved portrait (illustration, below) states, a "Lust-hof" (a retreat, or "pleasure house"). Nevertheless, it is situated entre cour et jardin ("between courtyard and garden") as Versailles and its imitators, and even as fine Parisian private houses are. The dry paved and gravelled courtyard, lightly screened from the road by a wrought-iron grille, is domesticated by a traditional plat of box-bordered green, the homely touch of a cross in a circle one might find in a bourgeois garden. The volumes of the palace are rhythmically broken in their massing. They work down symmetrically, expressing the subordinate roles of their use and occupants, and the final outbuildings in Marot's plan extend along the public thoroughfare, like a well-made and delightfully ordinary street.

Garden

The private "Great Garden" is situated behind the house. This Dutch Baroque garden, often nicknamed the "Versailles of Holland", actually serves to show more differences than similarities. It is still within the general Baroque formula established by André le Nôtre: perfect symmetry, axial layout with radiating gravel walks, parterres with fountains, basins and statues.

The garden as it appears in the engraving was designed by Le Nôtre's nephew, Claude Desgotz. Throughout his military and diplomatic career, William of Orange was the continental antagonist of Louis XIV, the commander of the forces opposed to those of absolute power and Roman Catholicism. André Le Nôtre's main axis at Versailles, continued by the canal, runs up to the horizon. Daniel Marot and Desgotz's Het Loo garden does not dominate the landscape as Louis' German imitators do, though in his idealized plan, Desgotz extends the axis. The main garden, with conservative rectangular beds instead of more elaborately shaped ones, is an enclosed space surrounded by raised walks, as a Renaissance garden might be, tucked into the woods for private enjoyment, the garden not of a king but of a stadhouder. At its far end a shaded crosswalk of trees disguised the central vista. The orange trees set out in wooden boxes and wintered in an orangery, which were a feature of all gardens, did double duty for the House of Orange-Nassau.

Outside the garden there are a few straight scenic avenues, for following the hunt in a carriage, or purely for the vista afforded by an avenue. Few of the "green rooms" cut into the woodlands in imitation of the cabinets de verdure of Versailles that are shown in the engraving were ever actually executed at Het Loo.

The patron of the Sun King's garden was Apollo. Peter the Great would opt for Samson, springing the jaws of Sweden's heraldic lion. William opted for Hercules.

In the 18th century, William IIIs Baroque garden as seen in the engraving was replaced by an English landscape garden.

The lost gardens of Het Loo were fully restored beginning in 1970 and completed in time to celebrate the building's 1984 tercentenary. Het Loo's new brickwork, latticework and ornaments are as raw as they must have been in 1684 and will mellow with time.

Het Loo House 
Het Loo House was built in the palace grounds in 1975, as a home for Princess Margriet and Mr Pieter van Vollenhoven. It is largely single-storey and in a modern style of its time.

Visitors 
The museum had 249,435 visitors in 2012 and 410,000 visitors in 2013. It was the 8th most visited museum in the Netherlands in 2013.

Gallery

See also
 List of Baroque residences
 De Naald – a monument near Het Loo
 Het Oude Loo

Notes

External links

 Paleis Het Loo
Paleis Het Loo
Paleis Het Loo National Museum / Library

Baroque gardens
Baroque palaces in the Netherlands
Buildings of the Dutch Golden Age
Gardens in the Netherlands
Historic house museums in the Netherlands
History museums in the Netherlands
Houses completed in 1686
Landscape design history
Museums in Apeldoorn
National museums of the Netherlands
Palaces in the Netherlands
Rijksmonuments in Apeldoorn
Royal residences in the Netherlands
Tourist attractions in Gelderland
1686 establishments in the Dutch Republic